Top Naija Music Awards (abbreviated TNMA Awards) is an annual event for emerging recording singers, songwriters, and producers in Nigeria.

History
The event is composed of 26 categories. The first edition of the Top Naija Music Awards was held on 28 December 2012 at the Blue Pearl Hall, Toyin Street, Ikeja, Lagos State. Its second edition was held on 16 May 2015 at Victoria Island, with host Denrele Edun, as it honors Nigerian emerging stars at the ceremony, and awarded Reekado Banks for Revelation of the Year at the event.

At the seventh edition of the TNMA Awards, one of the winners got a support funds from the organizers.

Ceremonies

Award categories

Artiste of the Year
Best Afro Pop Single
Best Collaboration with "A" List Artiste
Best Alternative Single
Best Collaboration
Best Song/Sound Recording
Best Street Single
Best Gospel Single
Best Rap Single
Best DJ
Best RNB Single
Best Teen Act (Male)
Best Teen Act (female)
Industrious Act
Best Inspirational Song with a Message
Best Afro Reggae Single
EP/Album of the year
Best Foreign Based Nigerian Artiste
Best Music Video
Best Record Label
Music Video Director
Artiste With Potential
Best Commercial Single
Best Sound Recording / Artiste to Watch
Best Hip Hop Single
Artiste With Potential

Past award categories

Recognition Award
Best Vocal Artiste (Male)
Best Vocal Artiste (Female)
Legendary Award
Indigenous Act Award
Pop/Rock Act With Potential Award
Male Act With Potential Award
Female Act With Potential Award
Highlife Act With Potential Award
Hip Hop Act With Potential Award
Indigenous Act With Potential Award
Gospel Music Icon Award
Most Promising Artiste (Male)
Most Promising Artiste (Female)
Best Lyrical Exploration/Lyricist (Male/Female)
Best Afro Hip Hop Single
Highlife Act With Potential
Best Gospel Music Video
Best Recording with A List Act
Best Indigenous Single
Emerging Male Act With Potential
Emerging Female Act With Potential
Emerging Gospel Act of the Year
Recording of the Year
Best Nigerian International Act
Best Performing Act

References

Awards established in 2012
Nigerian music awards